Janet Kay Bogle  (born 17 January 1958) is an English actor and vocalist, best known for her 1979 lovers rock hit "Silly Games".

Biography
Janet Kay Bogle was born in Willesden, North West London. She was discovered singing impromptu at a rehearsal studio by Tony "Gad" Robinson, the keyboardist from Aswad, who recommended Kay to Alton Ellis. The Jamaican-born Ellis, a successful rocksteady vocalist, had relocated permanently to London, where he continued to be involved with reggae music and was looking for a female vocalist to record a reggae cover of Minnie Riperton's song "Lovin' You". 

In 1978 Kay recorded "I Do Love You" and "That's What Friends Are For". The single "Silly Games", written and produced by Dennis Bovell, was released in 1979 and became a hit across Europe, reaching No. 2 in the UK Singles Chart. The chart success of "Silly Games" led to Kay appearing on Top of the Pops, then the BBC's flagship music programme. She played the character Angel in the UK sitcom No Problem!, created by the Black Theatre Co-operative (now NitroBeat) and broadcast on Channel 4 (1983–85). While on the programme, she enjoyed a further club hit with "Eternally Grateful" in 1984, which also reached the UK top 100.

Kay has recorded, and co-produced her seventh album for Sony Music Japan. It was released on 18 June 2003, and is entitled Lovin' You … More. The popularity of the song "Lovin' You" in Japan is so strong that she was asked to record it again for this album (for the third time). That version was produced by Omar.

"Silly Games" first hit the UK charts in 1979, and appeared again in 1990 as a re-recording, billed as by Lindy Layton featuring Janet Kay, which reached No. 22. A remix version of Kay's original recording spent three weeks in the UK Singles Chart, peaking at No. 62.

Kay is credited as producer on "Missing You", recorded by Aswad.

She was a founding member of BiBi Crew, Britain's first theatre troupe made up entirely of Black women.

Kay was included on the 2003 list of "100 Great Black Britons".

In November 2022, "Silly Games" was named the runner up in a list of the 70 best number two singles, compiled by UK newspaper The Guardian to commemorate the 70th anniversary of the UK Singles Chart.

Kay was appointed Member of the Order of the British Empire (MBE) in the 2023 New Year Honours for services to music.

Discography

Albums
Capricorn Woman (1982, Arawak)
So Amazing (1988, Body Music)
Sweet Surrender (1989, Body Music)
Lovin' You (1991, Sony Music Japan)
Love You Always (1993, Sony Music Japan)
For the Love of You (1994, Sony Music Japan)
Making History (1998, Sony Music Japan)
Through the Years (1999, Sony Music Japan)
Now & Then (2001, Sony Music Japan)
Lovin' You ... More (2003, Sony Music Japan)
Idol Kay (2012, Universal Music Japan)
Dramatic Lovers (2012, Sony Music Japan)

Singles

References

External links
 Official website
 
 
 Janet Kay's Myspace
 Sony Music Japan's Janet Kay Page (Japanese)

1958 births
Living people
21st-century Black British women singers
English reggae musicians
Lovers rock musicians
20th-century Black British women singers
English people of Jamaican descent
People from Willesden
Musicians from London
Members of the Order of the British Empire